Finansdepartementet may refer to:

Ministry of Finance (Sweden), the government office responsible for economic matters, such as central government budget and taxes, in Sweden
Ministry of Finance (Norway), the government office responsible for state finance, including the state budget, taxation and economic policy, in Norway